Gonzalo Sebastián Sosa (born 5 March 2005) is an Argentine footballer currently playing as a midfielder for Racing.

Club career
Born in Buenos Aires, Sosa started his career with Boca Juniors. After his parents no longer had the time or money to take him to Boca, he joined Defensa y Justicia, but this too was short-lived, and he joined Racing Club in exchange for ten footballs.

He has been linked with a move to numerous top European clubs, with Barcelona, Real Madrid and Paris Saint-Germain having been touted as potential suitors. Manchester City, Manchester United and Bayern Munich have also been linked with Sosa.

Style of play
A fast-paced attacking midfielder, he has drawn comparisons with former Argentine international Juan Román Riquelme, with Sosa himself stating that he liked the former playmaker.

References

2005 births
Living people
Footballers from Buenos Aires
Argentine footballers
Association football midfielders
Boca Juniors footballers
Defensa y Justicia footballers
Racing Club de Avellaneda footballers